Welsh nationalism emphasises and celebrates the distinctiveness of Welsh culture and Wales as a nation or country. Welsh nationalism may also include calls for further autonomy or self determination which includes Welsh devolution, meaning increased powers for the Senedd, or full Welsh independence.

History

English rule in Wales 

Through most of its history before the Anglo-Norman Conquest, Wales was divided into several kingdoms. From time to time, rulers such as Hywel Dda, Gruffudd ap Llywelyn and Rhodri the Great managed to unify many of the kingdoms, but their lands were divided on their deaths.

Wales first appeared as a unified independent country in 1055 under the leadership of the only King of Wales to have controlled all the territories of Wales, Gruffydd ap Llywelyn until 1063. Three years later the Norman invasion began which briefly controlled much of Wales, but by 1100 Anglo-Normans control was reduced to the lowland Gwent, Glamorgan, Gower, and Pembroke, regions which experienced considerable Anglo-Norman colonisation, while the contested border region between the Welsh princes and Anglo-Norman barons became known as the Welsh Marches.

Incursions from the English and Normans also amplified divisions between the kingdoms. In the 12th century, Norman king Henry II of England exploited differences between the three most powerful Welsh kingdoms, Gwynedd, Powys, and Deheubarth, allowing him to make great gains in Wales. He defeated and then allied with Madog ap Maredudd of Powys in 1157, and used this alliance to overwhelm Owain Gwynedd. He then turned on Rhys ap Gruffydd of Deheubarth, who finally submitted to him in 1171, effectively subjugating much of Wales to Henry's Angevin Empire. 

In the 13th century, the last prince of Wales, Llywelyn the Last retained his rights to Wales in agreement with King Henry in the treaty of Montgomery in 1267. Henry's successor, Edward I disapproved of Llywelyn's alliance with Simon de Montfort, who revolted along with other barons against the English king in the second barons' war of 1264 to 1267 and so in 1276, Edward's army forced Llywelyn into an agreement that saw Llywelyn withdraw his powers to Gwynedd only. In 1282 whilst attempting to gather support in Cilmeri near Builth Wells, Llywelyn was killed by one of Edward's soldiers. Llywelyn's brother, Dafydd ap Gruffydd briefly led a force in Wales, but was captured and later hung drawn and quartered by Edward, thus ending Welsh independence.

Since conquest, there have been Welsh rebellions against English rule. The last, and the most significant revolt was the Glyndŵr Rising of 1400–1415, which briefly restored independence. Owain Glyndŵr held the first Welsh parliament (Senedd) in Machynlleth in 1404 where he was proclaimed Prince of Wales and a second parliament in 1405 in Harlech. Following the eventual defeat of the Glyndŵr rebellion and a brief period of independence, it wasn't until 1999 that a Welsh legislative body was re-established as the National Assembly of Wales which was renamed Senedd Cymru/Welsh Parliament in 2020.

In the 16th century, King Henry VIII of the Tudor dynasty, (a royal house of Welsh origin) and the English parliament, passed the Laws in Wales Acts, also referred to as the "Acts of Union", which incorporated Wales fully into the Kingdom of England.

During the reign of Henry VIII the Laws in Wales Acts 1535 and 1542 were passed without any democratic mandate, annexing Wales into the English legal system. The repressive measures against the Welsh that had been in place since the revolt of Owain Glyndŵr over a century earlier were removed. As a result of the passage of the Acts, the Welsh language was stripped of its official status and role within Wales. The Welsh legal system was also in turn abolished in order to legally integrate Wales into the English legal system. These Acts also gave political representation for Wales in the Westminster Parliament.

19th century 
The rapid industrialisation of parts of Wales, especially Merthyr Tydfil and adjoining areas, gave rise to strong and radical Welsh working class movements which led to the Merthyr Rising of 1831, the widespread support for Chartism, and the Newport Rising of 1839.

With the establishment of the Presbyterian Church of Wales, nonconformism triumphed in Wales, and gradually the previous majority of conservative voices within the church allied themselves with the more radical and liberal voices within the older dissenting churches of the Baptists and Congregationalists. This radicalism was exemplified by the Congregationalist minister David Rees of Llanelli, who edited the radical magazine Y Diwygiwr (The Reformer) from 1835 until 1865. But he was not a lone voice: William Rees (also known as Gwilym Hiraethog) established the radical Yr Amserau (The Times) in 1843, and in the same year Samuel Roberts also established another radical magazine, Y Cronicl (The Chronicle). Both were Congregationalist pastors.

Treason of the Blue Books 
Welsh nationalists were outraged by the Reports of the Commissioners of Inquiry into the state of education in Wales in 1847. The reports had blue covers, and were ridiculed as Brad y Llyfrau Gleision, or in English, "The Treason of the Blue Books".  They found the education system in Wales to be in a dreadful state; they condemned the Welsh language and Nonconformist religion. The Commissioners report is infamously known for its description of Welsh speakers as barbaric and immoral. Ralph Lingen was responsible for the Blue Books of 1846. By contrast the Reverend Henry Longueville Jones, Her Majesty's Inspector of church schools in Wales between 1848 and 1865, led the opposition to subordination to the education department under Lingen. Jones's reports supported bilingual education and praised the work of many church elementary schools. They came under attack in Whitehall. Jones failed to gain full support in Wales because of his Anglicanism and his criticisms of many certified teachers.

Cymru Fydd 
Lloyd George was one of the main leaders of Cymru Fydd which was an organisation created with the aim of establishing a Welsh Government and a "stronger Welsh identity". As such Lloyd George was seen as a radical figure in British politics and was associated with the reawakening of Welsh nationalism and identity, saying in 1880, "Is it not high time that Wales should the powers to manage its own affairs".  Historian Emyr Price has referred to him as "the first architect of Welsh devolution and its most famous advocate’" as well as "the pioneering advocate of a powerful parliament for the Welsh people". Lloyd George was also particularly active in attempting to set up a separate Welsh National Party which was based on Parnell's Irish Parliamentary Party and also worked to unite the North and South Wales Liberal Federations with Cymru Fydd to form a Welsh National Liberal Federation. The Cymru Fydd movement collapsed in 1896 amid personal rivalries and rifts between Liberal representatives such as David Alfred Thomas.

Industrial period 
The growth of radicalism and the gradual politicisation of Welsh life did not include any successful attempt to establish a separate political vehicle for promoting Welsh nationalism.  Although the Industrial Revolution in Wales did give rise to the patriotic movements, Anglicised influences still held a grip on Wales and had a negative effect on the language and Welsh nationalism. English was still seen legally as the only official language of Wales and was seen as the language of progress. As the numbers of workers within Welsh coal mines grew in numbers of migrants from England, and other English influences spread into Wales due to the development of the railways, the Welsh language was left behind by many in favour of English as it was seen as an effective and more progressive language in the new industrialised world. Some, as seen evident from the 1911 census, decided against passing on the Welsh language and culture to future generations in favour of integrating with the English way of life in order to have greater success in life through careers and acceptance into the wider community. For the first time in 2,000 years in Wales the Welsh language was now a minority language, with only 43.5% of the population speaking the language. Welsh nationalism weakened under the economic pressure as the coal industry of South Wales increasingly was integrated with English industry.  On the whole nationalism was the preserve of antiquarians, not political activists.

20th century 
The Labour Party dominated politics in 1920s; it suffered a sharp setback in 1931, but maintained its hold on Wales. The leftists such as Aneurin Bevan  who dominated the Party in Wales rejected nationalism as a backward reactionary movement that was more favorable to capitalism and not to socialism. Instead they wanted a strong government in London to reshape the entire state economy.

In 1925 Plaid Genedlaethol Cymru (“the National Party of Wales”) was founded which was renamed Plaid Cymru - The Party of Wales in 1945. The party's principles since its founding are (1) self government for Wales, (2) to safeguard the culture traditions, language and economic position of Wales and (3) to secure membership for a self-governing Welsh state in the United Nations. The party's first Westminster seat (MP) was won by Gwynfor Evans in 1966. By 1974 the party had won three MP seats and in the 2019 general election it won four seats. Following the formation of the Senedd 1999, Plaid Cymru has  won 17 of 60 seats in the initial Welsh election of 1999 and 13 MS seats in 2021.
In the 1950s, the deterioration of the British Empire removed a sense of Britishness and there was a realisation that Wales was not as prosperous as south-east England and smaller European countries. Successive Conservative Party victories in Westminster led to suggestions that only through self-government could Wales achieve a government reflecting the votes of a Welsh electorate. The Tryweryn flooding which was voted against by every single Welsh MP, suggested that Wales as a nation was powerless. The Epynt clearance in 1940 has also been described as a "significant - but often overlooked - chapter in the history of Wales".

On 1 July 1955, a conference of all parties was called at Llandrindod by the New Wales Union (Undeb Cymru Fydd) to consider a national petition for the campaign for a Parliament for Wales. The main leader was Megan Lloyd George, the daughter of David Lloyd George, T. I. Ellis, and Sir Ifan ab Owen Edwards. According to the historian Dr William Richard Philip George, "Megan was responsible for removing much prejudice against the idea of a parliament for Wales". She later presented the petition with 250,000 signatures to the British government in April 1956.

Official flag and capital city 

The first official flag of Wales was created in 1953 for the coronation of Queen Elizabeth II. This "augmented" flag including the Royal badge of Wales was criticised in 1958 by the "Gorsedd y Beirdd", a national Welsh group comprising Welsh literary figures and Welsh people of note. In 1959, likely in response to criticism, the Welsh flag was changed to a red Welsh dragon on a green and white background that remains the current flag of Wales today.

On 21 December 1955, the Lord Mayor of Cardiff announced to a crowd that Cardiff was now the official capital of Wales following a parliamentary vote the previous day by Welsh local authority members. Cardiff won the vote with 136 votes compared to second-placed Caernarfon with 11. A campaign for Cardiff to become the capital city had been ongoing for 30 years prior to the vote. Historian James Cowan outlined some reasons why Cardiff was chosen which included; being the largest city in Wales with a population of 243,632, buildings in Cathays park such as City Hall and the National Museum of Wales among other reasons. Dr Martin Johnes, lecturer at Swansea University claims that Cardiff had become "a capital in a meaningful way, as the home of the Welsh government, whereas before, its capital status was irrelevant, it was just symbolic" prior to the formation of the devolved assembly of 1999.

21st century 

A 2007 survey by BBC Wales Newsnight found that 20% of Welsh people surveyed favoured Wales becoming independent of the United Kingdom.

In 2009 the Archbishop of Wales, Dr Barry Morgan, renewed his call for the then Assembly to be granted full law-making powers, calling for a "greater degree of self-determination" for Wales.

A YouGov poll taken in September 2015 suggested that 17% of Welsh people would vote for independence. Another poll by Face for Business suggests support could be as high as 28%. These are in stark contrast to the last two polls conducted by icm for the BBC which said support is as low as 5% and 3% respectively.

The 2016 United Kingdom European Union membership referendum saw the voters in Wales choosing the "Leave" option by 52.5 per cent to 47.5 per cent.

A Welsh Political Barometer poll, conducted for ITV-Cymru Wales and Cardiff University's Wales Governance Centre from 30 June to 4 July 2016, showed support for Welsh independence had increased following the Brexit vote. Responding to the question “And please imagine a scenario where the rest of the UK left the European Union but Wales could remain a member of the European Union if it became an independent country. If a referendum was then held in Wales about becoming an independent country and this was the question, how would you vote? Should Wales be an independent country?” the results were: Yes: 28%, No: 53% Would Not Vote/Don't Know: 20%. Removing non-committed voters, 35% of those polled would vote for independence.

In 2022, Dafydd Iwan's 1983 protest song 'Yma o Hyd' became an anthem for the Welsh World Cup football team. This song is undoubtedly a nationalist song, with lyrics referencing events in Welsh history.

Major active parties and movements 
 YesCymru is a non party-political campaign for an independent Wales. The organisation was formed in the Summer of 2014 and officially launched on 20 February 2016 in Cardiff.
Plaid Cymru - The Party of Wales founded in 1925. The party's principles since its founding are (1) self government for Wales, (2) to safeguard the culture traditions, language and economic position of Wales and (3) to secure membership for a self-governing Welsh state in the United Nations. 
 Cymdeithas yr Iaith Gymraeg (Welsh Language Society). Established in 1962 by members of Plaid Cymru, it is a pressure group campaigning for Welsh language rights. It uses non-violent direct action in its campaigning, and sees itself as part of the global resistance movement.

Militant nationalism

Mainstream nationalism in Wales has been constitutional, and in Wales a pacifist instinct of Welsh nonconformist persisted before and after 1939. However there have been some militant movements in Wales described as Welsh militant nationalism.

 In 1952 a small republican movement, Y Gweriniaethwyr ("The Republicans"), were the first to use violence when they made an unsuccessful attempt to blow up a pipeline leading from the Claerwen dam in mid Wales to Birmingham.
 In the 1960s two movements were established in protest against the drowning of the Tryweryn valley and the 1969 investiture of Charles, Prince of Wales: Mudiad Amddiffyn Cymru ("Movement for the Defence of Wales", also known as MAC) and the Free Wales Army (also known as FWA, in Welsh Byddin Rhyddid Cymru). MAC were responsible for numerous bombing attacks on water pipelines and power lines across Wales. On the eve of the investiture two alleged members of MAC, Alwyn Jones and George Taylor, died when the bomb they were planting outside a Social Security Office in Abergele exploded.
 The late 1970s and the 1980s saw an organisation calling itself Meibion Glyndŵr ("sons of Glyndŵr") responsible for a spate of arson attacks against holiday homes throughout Wales. In the 1970s, a Welsh Socialist Republican Army arose, whose initials in Welsh spelt out the English word "DAWN": the Welsh Army for the Welsh Republic (WAWR).

See also

In Wales 

 Welsh independence
 Welsh devolution
 List of movements in Wales
 Cofiwch Dryweryn

Similar nationalist movements 

 Irish nationalism
 Irish republicanism
 Scottish independence
 Scottish nationalism
 Cornish nationalism
 Cornish self-government movement
 Breton nationalism

Celtic movements 

 Celtic Congress
 Celtic League (political organisation)
 Celts (modern)

References

Sources/bibliography

 Clewes, Roy (1980), To dream of freedom: the struggle of M.A.C. and the Free Wales Army. Talybont: Y Lolfa. .
 Butt Philip, Alan. The Welsh question: nationalism in Welsh politics, 1945–1970 (University of Wales Press, 1975).
 Davies, John (Ed.) (1981), Cymru'n deffro: hanes y Blaid Genedlaethol, 1925–75. Talybont: Y Lolfa. . A series of essays on the history of the first fifty years of Plaid Cymru.
 Davies, R. R (1997) The Revolt of Owain Glyn Dwr. (Oxford UP, 1997) .
 Gruffudd, Pyrs. "Remaking Wales: nation-building and the geographical imagination, 1925–1950." Political Geography 14#3 (1995): 219–239.
 Jones, Richard Wyn, and Roger Scully. Wales says yes: devolution and the 2011 Welsh referendum (University of Wales Press, 2012).
 Morgan, Kenneth O. Rebirth of a nation: Wales, 1880–1980 (Clarendon Press, 1981) .
 Morgan, Kenneth O. "Welsh nationalism: The historical background." Journal of Contemporary History 6.1 (1971): 153–172. in JSTOR
 Morgan, K. O. (1971), 'Radicalism and nationalism'. In A. J. Roderick (Ed.), Wales through the ages. Vol II: Modern Wales, pp. 193–200. Llandybïe: Christopher Davies (Publishers) Ltd. .
 Wyn Thomas (2013), Hands Off Wales: Nationhood and Militancy, (Gomer) 
 Williams, G. A, When Was Wales?: A History of the Welsh. London. Black Raven Press, 
 Humphries, John, "Freedom Fighters: Wales' forgotten war, 1963–1993," Cardiff, University of Wales Press, .
 Dr Wyn Thomas (y Lolfa, 2019) John Jenkins: The Reluctant Revolutionary? Hardback: ; Paperback:

External links
 

 
Separatism in the United Kingdom
Celtic nationalism
Campaigns and movements in Wales